Tetragammoth is the 2002 debut album by alternative hip hop artist Baracuda72. Most of the album's production was handled by Orphan, the Plague Language collective's most prolific producer at the time.

The track "Deadly Rays", featuring Plague Language affiliate Noah23, was released as a split single with the track "Crypto Sporidian" from Noah23's album Quicksand. Both tracks were produced by Orphan.

Track listing
"Tetragammoth" (ft. StapleMouth)
"The Pattern That Lies Beneath Us"
"Waking Life Moment"
"Human Development"
"Deadly Rays" (ft. Noah23)
"Ice Age"
"Royal City Chainsaw Massacre"
"Unpardonable Sins"
"Dental Plan" (ft. Noah23)
"Mulberry Skies"
"Snap"
"Satellites" (ft. Livestock)
"Mutagen" (ft. Hangnail & Modulok)
"Rain Buckets"
"Duplicate Version" (ft. Noah23)
"Regime"

Production credits 
Tracks 1, 5-10 & 14-16 produced by Orphan
Tracks 2 & 13 produced by Lovely
Track 3 produced by Sseleman
Track 4 produced by Northstar
Track 11 produced by Bionix
Track 12 produced by Warhol

References

2002 debut albums